Otagoa is a genus of South Pacific araneomorph spiders in the family Toxopidae, and was first described by Raymond Robert Forster in 1970.  it contains only three species, all found in New Zealand: O. chathamensis, O. nova, and O. wiltoni.

References

Araneomorphae genera
Spiders of New Zealand
Taxa named by Raymond Robert Forster
Toxopidae